Events in the year 2019 in the Czech Republic.

Incumbents
 President – Miloš Zeman
 Prime Minister – Andrej Babiš

Events

24 and 25 May – Scheduled date for the 2019 European Parliament election in the Czech Republic
10 December – Ostrava hospital attack: In Ostrava, a man opens fire in a hospital's waiting room, killing six people before fleeing and subsequently shooting himself dead.

Deaths

5 January – , literary scholar, expert in Bohumil Hrabal work (b. 1929).

7 January – Ivan Mašek, dissident, economist and politician, Deputy (b. 1948).

10 January – , priest and ex-bishop of Czechoslovak Hussite Church (b. 1951).

15 January – Antonín Kramerius, footballer (b. 1939).

26 January – Luděk Munzar, actor (b. 1933).

20 April – Luděk Bukač, ice hockey player and manager (b. 1935).

29 April – Josef Šural, footballer (b. 1990)

1 October – Karel Gott, singer, actor, songwriter, painter (b. 1939)

References

 
2010s in the Czech Republic
Years of the 21st century in the Czech Republic
Czech Republic
Czech Republic